Mitra Robot (with Mitra meaning "friend") is a  Humanoid Robot designed and developed by the Indian startup Invento Robotics, a robotic company in Bangalore founded by Balaji Viswanathan. Mitra Robot made its first appearance in November 2017 at the Global Entrepreneurship Summit in 2017 where it greeted Ivanka Trump, senior advisor to former U.S. President Trump, and also interacted with Indian Prime Minister Narendra Modi.

Description
The five feet tall robot, Mitra-2, is India’s first humanoid robot built and designed to engage in hospitality management and workplace productivity. Mitra can be integrated with a range of CRM applications and interacts with customers over voice. It has also received media coverage in 2017 during the Global Entrepreneurship Summit.

Features
 Mitra runs on a propriety operating system. Its body is made of fibreglass and is equipped with a touchscreen, and once charged, could last up to 8–10 hours.
This robot can interact using facial, speech recognition, contextual help and autonomous navigation .
This robot is designed in a way such that it can recognize speech in multiple languages.
Mitra 3 has three degrees of freedom (shoulder, elbow, and finger movements) on each hand and one on the head, thus allowing it to welcome guests with a ‘namaste’ and also demonstrate other hand gestures, i.e., beckoning people.
Mitra 3 has a better display on the chest and comes with a better resolution, as well as camera quality.
Mitra 3 is also capable of seamless autonomous movement and obstacle detection, along with speech synthesis in regional Asian languages like Hindi, Tamil, and Sinhalese.

Usage
Mitra Robot has been used in banks, wedding and birthday parties, hotels, malls, airports, cinema halls and hospitals.

Events
Mitra robot was used in Tathva 19, the annual techno-management fest organised by NIT-C (National Institute of Technology Calicut) that was held in Mukkam, Kozhikode on 18 October 2019. Mitra reportedly greeted the dignitaries and delivered a speech thanking Tathva team.

References

External links
 

Humanoid robots
2017 robots
Robots of India